A referendum on separating from Saint Kitts and Nevis was held in Anguilla on 11 July 1967. In February Anguilla had become part of the Saint Christopher-Nevis-Anguilla federation. However, on 30 May the police were expelled and a "Peace Keeping Committee" installed as a government. The referendum was approved by 99.72% of voters, and the following day "President" Ronald Webster declared the separation. However, his new government was not recognised by either the Saint Christopher-Nevis-Anguilla federation or the United Kingdom.

Results

Aftermath
A related referendum was held in 1969 with similar results.

References

Anguilla
Referendums in Anguilla
1967 in Saint Kitts-Nevis-Anguilla
July 1967 events in North America